"Outta Here" is a song by Belgian singer and actress Laura Tesoro. The song was released as a digital download in Belgium on 27 August 2014 through Top Act Music. It has peaked at number 23 in Flanders, and was written by Tom Lodewyckx, Eva Jane Smeenk and Laura Tesoro.

Music video
A music video to accompany the release of "Outta Here" was first released onto YouTube on 27 August 2014 at a total length of three minutes and ten seconds.

Track listing

Charts

Release history

References

2014 debut singles
2014 songs
Laura Tesoro songs